Nikifor Mran'ka (1901-1973) (Chuvash and ) was a Chuvash writer and playwright. He was born on July 9, 1901 in Pileshkasy, which is a village in the Kozlovsky District, Chuvash Republic. He was part of the USSR Union of Writers in 1939, fought during the Russian Civil War and World War II. He died on February 20, 1973.

Biography 

After finishing elementary school in a rural area, he began a course for continuity writers in Moscow.

He participated in the Russian Civil War. After returning from war, he worked as chairman of the village council.

In 1928, his first drama, Elnet was performed at the Chuvash theater in Cheboksary. Later works included Тӳнтерлене хирӗҫ (Against an ambiguity) and "Виҫҫӗшӗ те пӗр калӑпран (All three one test).  Nikifor Fyodorovich also worked as the director of a newsreel and as the editor of the regional newspaper.

He served during World War II on the front lines.  Afterward, he served as the longtime head of the Department of Propaganda and Propagation of the Kozlovsky District Party Committee. For excellence in literature he was awarded the Certificate of Honour of Presidium of the Supreme Body Chuvash АССР (1971).

Famous works 

 Итлӗр! – Listen! (drama, 1930);
 Пӗрремӗш категори – high category (comedy, 1932)
 Элнет – Elnet (drama, 1933);
 Салют – Salute (play, 1936);
 Аван пурӑнатпӑр – Good life (play, 1938);
 Бурлаксем (drama, 1941);
 Ӗмӗр сакки сарлака – Life is life (novel, I- 1959, 1965, 1989; II- 1960, 1967, 1989; III- 1961, 1971, IV- 1971, V- 1980);
 Юратнӑ чӗресем – Loving hearts (1962);

Memorial

Mran'ka Street in Cheboksary is named after him.

Collections 

 Чӑваш литературин антологийӗ (Chuvash literature anthology), editing: D. V. Gordeev, J. A. Silem. Cheboksary, 2003.  .
 Алексеев В. Н. Век прожить – не поле прейти. Очерк в книге Писатели (Серия Библиотека Президента Чувашии) Cheboksary, 2008, стр.2003 – 213.

References

External links 
 Nikifor Mran'ka, biography

Soviet writers
Chuvash writers
1901 births
1973 deaths